Dave Richardson (born 8 May 1958) is a New Zealand cricketer. He played in one List 1984/85 match for Central Districts in 1984/85.

See also
 List of Central Districts representative cricketers

References

External links
 

1958 births
Living people
New Zealand cricketers
Central Districts cricketers
Sportspeople from Upper Hutt